Kardomia odontocalyx is a shrub of the myrtaceae found  in northern New South Wales in eastern Australia.

References

Flora of New South Wales
Flora of Queensland
Myrtaceae